La Foa – Oua Tom Airport  is an airport in La Foa, New Caledonia.

History

World War II
The 67th Fighter Squadron operating P-39s was based here from 24 April-17 June 1943.

References

External links
 Oua Tom Airport at OurAirports

Airports in New Caledonia
Airfields of the United States Army Air Forces in the Pacific Ocean theatre of World War II